The Abel I. Smith Burial Ground (also spelled Able I. Smith Burial Ground) was a family burial plot in Hudson County, New Jersey, United States.

Location
The land owned by Abel Smith stretched far; in a 1908 edition of The New York Times, the farm is said to have been bisected by Secaucus Road, and "between the Paterson Plank Road on the north, the Penn Horn Creek on the East, the lands of S. Jacobs on the south, and the old Secaucus racetrack to the west."

The burial ground lay in a grove at one of the highest spots in Secaucus, obscured by high grass and trees, overlooking the expanse of the meadows and into the Hackensack River. It was bordered on the west side by County Road and the grounds of a Mental Disease Hospital that is no longer in existence, currently located near the intersection of Secaucus Road and County Road. The Abel I. Smith Burial Ground faces the Hudson Palisades on the west and the marshes of Secaucus on the east.

Along with the Van Buskirk Family Burial Ground, the Sandford Family Burial Ground and others, the Abel I. Smith Burial Ground is one of a few recognized family burial grounds in Hudson County.

History

In 1733, Abel Smith and his wife Deborah moved from Great Neck to Secaucus, where he bought a large tract of land and constructed a large mansion. The first burial on the grounds was that of Abel Smith himself, who died in 1755.

The Smith family owned the plot from the 18th century until the early 20th century. The property was passed down through the generations, and as a result, many of the burials were of the Smith family themselves. However, a few other families were buried there over the course of its use as a cemetery, namely the Post and Earle families.

In the year 1875, "Jack" Jackson, who was described as the last slave in New Jersey, died at the age of 87 on the Smith family farm. In 1820, Smith manumitted his slaves, but Jack refused the freedom he was offered and remained on the family estate until his death. Following the will of the late Abel Smith, he was interred in the family burial ground.

Overall, the Abel I. Smith Burial Ground contained roughly 64 gravesites. The site held several vaults; the crypt had 24 shelves, with 12 coffins reserved for adults and 12 for children. These were reserved for the Smith family. In 1950, it was reported that all the vaults had been broken into and all the bodies had been removed, likely by grave robbers.

Sale
On December 1, 1908, the deed to the Smith land was turned over to B.M. Shanley's Sons' Company of Newark and the H.S. Korbaugh Company of West Virginia for the sum of $255,000. Although the site is no longer used as a cemetery, the remains of those buried were never removed, giving the usage of the land as a cemetery under the Smiths' ownership a span of roughly 153 years, and it is presumed that the bodies are still buried there.

After the sale to the respective companies, a proposal was aired to turn the grounds into a park. In 1948, a Secaucus librarian named Marion Dudley also supported the preservation of the site as a park due to its old age and its high position, which would provide a good view over Secaucus. However, these proposals apparently failed.

Attempts to transcribe the gravestones have been undertaken, and several lists exist. It is believed that the original burial site was built over by a UPS company warehouse, and that the bodies still lie in their plots.

See also
List of cemeteries in Hudson County, New Jersey

References

Sources

External links
 Able I. Smith Burial Ground at GraveInfo
 

Cemeteries in Hudson County, New Jersey
Secaucus, New Jersey
1755 establishments in the Thirteen Colonies